Hanasaki Station is the name of two train stations in Japan:

 Hanasaki Station (Hokkaido) (花咲駅)
 Hanasaki Station (Saitama) (花崎駅)